Carpenter jeans are jeans with many pockets and loops which can be used to carry objects such as tools and are often loose around the leg to be able to accommodate the affixed items.  They are often worn by construction workers and carpenters, hence the name, to carry their tools so that their hands can be kept free yet the tools are still easily accessible.

Characteristics 
Carpenter jeans are usually made of blue denim. Canvas may be the material in more durable styles, and colors may vary; white and beige are other popular colors. A 'hammer loop' is usually located on the left leg; although this was originally designed with the intention of allowing carpenters to carry tools without the need for a tool belt, most carpenters do not use the loop, because the hammer often falls out or bangs around the leg. Other features include extra pockets, sometimes located on the outer thighs, and extra rivets for durability. Another feature is wider belt loops, to accommodate a wider, thicker belt.  Because of the weight of the tools carried in the pockets and loops, workers prerer a tightly cinched, wide 'work belt'.

Most carpenter jeans are made for function, not fashion, and are usually of a softer denim, some might be covered in fleece on the inside. The Carpenter Jeans are more comfortable than the original utilitarian jeans, with a looser fit. Carpenter jeans were quite popular in the late 1990s and early 2000s hip hop scene especially those by the Tommy Hilfiger brand who placed their trademark logo on the hammer loop.

See also 
 Cargo pants
 Tactical pants

References

Jeans by type
Workwear
Trousers and shorts
1990s fashion
2000s fashion